The 2005 Pan American Gymnastics Championships were held in Brazil. Artistic gymnastics events were competed in Rio de Janeiro, October 6–9, 2005, while rhythmic gymnastics events were held in Vitória, November 11–13, 2005.

Medalists

Artistic gymnastics

Rhythmic gymnastics

Medal table

References

External links 
 USA Gymnastics - Artistic gymnastics results
 USA Gymnastics - Individual rhythmic gymnastics results

2005 in gymnastics
Pan American Gymnastics Championships
International gymnastics competitions hosted by Brazil
2005 in Brazilian sport